Dargan in Iran may refer to:
 Dargan, Hormozgan (درگن - Dargan)
 Dargan, Isfahan (دارگان - Dārgān)
 Dargan, Yazd (دارگان - Dārgān)